Decadence (also known as Decadence Sweden) is an independent heavy metal band from Stockholm, Sweden, formed in November 2003. It is characterized by extreme female vocals.

Members
Current
'Metallic' Kitty Saric – vocals
 Kenneth Lantz – guitar
Past
 Christian Lindholm - guitar
Joakim Antman – bass
 Erik Röjås – drums
Niklas Skogqvist - guitar
Simon Galle - guitar

Discography

 Land of Despair (Demo, 2004)
 Decadence (2005)
 The Creature (2005)
 3rd Stage of Decay, 1st edition (limited-2006), 2nd edition (Japanese-2007) and 3rd edition (worldwide-2008)
 Chargepoint (2009)
 Undergrounder (2017)
 Six Tape (2019)

Contributed tracks to
 Thrashing Like a Maniac (Compilation, 2007)
 Melody and Malice (Compilation, 2011)
 Global Compilation Album vol 15 (Compilation, 2018)

References

External links
 Official website

Swedish death metal musical groups
Swedish thrash metal musical groups
Musical groups established in 2003
Musical quartets